Josef Kaminský (1878–1944) was a politician in interwar Czechoslovakia. He died in 1944. He worked as a newspaper editor. He was elected to the Czechoslovak Chamber of Deputies in the 1924 Užhorod electoral district by-election, the sole candidate of the Carpathian Republican Peasants Party elected.

References

1878 births
1944 deaths
People from Michalovce District
People from the Kingdom of Hungary
Republican Party of Farmers and Peasants politicians
Members of the Chamber of Deputies of Czechoslovakia (1920–1925)